Calcium hydroxide (traditionally called slaked lime) is an inorganic compound with the chemical formula Ca(OH)2. It is a colorless crystal or white powder and is produced when quicklime (calcium oxide) is mixed with water. It has many names including hydrated lime, caustic lime, builders' lime, slaked lime, cal, and pickling lime. Calcium hydroxide is used in many applications, including food preparation, where it has been identified as E number E526. Limewater, also called milk of lime, is the common name for a saturated solution of calcium hydroxide.

Properties
Calcium hydroxide is poorly soluble in water, with a retrograde solubility increasing from 0.66 g/L at 100 °C to 1.89 g/L at 0 °C. With a solubility product Ksp of 5.02 at 25 °C, its dissociation in water is large enough that its solutions are basic according to the following dissolution reaction:
 Ca(OH)2 → Ca2+ + 2 OH−

At ambient temperature, calcium hydroxide (portlandite) dissolves in water to produce an alkaline solution with a pH of about 12.5. Calcium hydroxide solutions can cause chemical burns. At high pH values due to a common-ion effect with the hydroxide anion, its solubility drastically decreases. This behavior is relevant to cement pastes. Aqueous solutions of calcium hydroxide are called limewater and are medium-strength bases, which react with acids and can attack some metals such as aluminium (amphoteric hydroxide dissolving at high pH), while protecting other metals, such as iron and steel, from corrosion by passivation of their surface. Limewater turns milky in the presence of carbon dioxide due to the formation of insoluble calcium carbonate, a process called carbonatation:
 Ca(OH)2 + CO2 → CaCO3 + H2O

When heated to 512 °C, the partial pressure of water in equilibrium with calcium hydroxide reaches 101kPa (normal atmospheric pressure), which decomposes calcium hydroxide into calcium oxide and water:
 Ca(OH)2 → CaO + H2O

Calcium hydroxide reacts with hydrogen chloride to first give calcium hydroxychloride and then calcium chloride.

Structure, preparation, occurrence

Calcium hydroxide adopts a polymeric structure, as do all metal hydroxides.  The structure is identical to that of Mg(OH) (brucite structure); i.e., the cadmium iodide motif. Strong hydrogen bonds exist between the layers.

Calcium hydroxide is produced commercially by treating (slaking) lime with water:
CaO + H2O → Ca(OH)2

In the laboratory it can be prepared by mixing aqueous solutions of calcium chloride and sodium hydroxide. The mineral form, portlandite, is relatively rare but can be found in some volcanic, plutonic, and metamorphic rocks. It has also been known to arise in burning coal dumps.

The positively charged ionized species CaOH+ has been detected in the atmosphere of S-type stars.

Retrograde solubility
According to Hopkins and Wulff (1965), the decrease of calcium hydroxide solubility with temperature was known since the works of Marcellin Berthelot (1875) and Julius Thomsen (1883) (see Thomsen–Berthelot principle), when the presence of ions in aqueous solutions was still questioned. Since, it has been studied in detail by many authors, a.o., Miller and Witt (1929) or Johnston and Grove (1931) and refined many times (e.g., Greenberg and Copeland (1960); Hopkins and Wulff (1965); Seewald and Seyfried (1991); Duchesne and Reardon (1995)).

The reason for this rather uncommon behavior is that the dissolution of calcium hydroxide in water is an exothermic process. Thus, according  to Le Chatelier's principle, a lowering of temperature favours the elimination of the heat liberated through the process of dissolution and increases the equilibrium constant of dissolution of Ca(OH)2, and so increases its solubility at low temperature. This counter-intuitive temperature dependence of the solubility is referred to as "retrograde" or "inverse" solubility. The variably hydrated phases of calcium sulfate (gypsum, bassanite and anhydrite) also exhibit a retrograde solubility for the same reason because their dissolution reactions are exothermic.

Uses
Calcium hydroxide is commonly used to prepare lime mortar.

One significant application of calcium hydroxide is as a flocculant, in water and sewage treatment. It forms a fluffy charged solid that aids in the removal of smaller particles from water, resulting in a clearer product. This application is enabled by the low cost and low toxicity of calcium hydroxide. It is also used in fresh-water treatment for raising the pH of the water so that pipes will not corrode where the base water is acidic, because it is self-regulating and does not raise the pH too much.

It is also used in the preparation of ammonia gas (NH3), using the following reaction:
 Ca(OH)2 + 2 NH4Cl → 2 NH3 + CaCl2 + 2 H2O

Another large application is in the paper industry, where it is an intermediate in the reaction in the production of sodium hydroxide. This conversion is part of the causticizing step in the Kraft process for making pulp. In the causticizing operation, burned lime is added to green liquor, which is a solution primarily of sodium carbonate and sodium sulfate produced by dissolving smelt, which is the molten form of these chemicals from the recovery furnace.

In orchard crops, calcium hydroxide is used as a fungicide. Applications of 'lime water' prevent the development of cankers caused by the fungal pathogen Neonectria galligena. The trees are sprayed when they are dormant in winter to prevent toxic burns from the highly reactive calcium hydroxide. This use is authorised in the European Union and the United Kingdom under Basic Substance regulations.

Calcium hydroxide is used in dentistry, primarily in the specialty of endodontics.

Food industry
Because of its low toxicity and the mildness of its basic properties, slaked lime is widely used in the food industry:
 In USDA certified food production in plants and livestock
 To clarify raw juice from sugarcane or sugar beets in the sugar industry, (see carbonatation)
 To process water for alcoholic beverages and soft drinks
 Pickle cucumbers and other foods
 To make Chinese century eggs
 In maize preparation: removes the cellulose hull of maize kernels (see nixtamalization)
 To clear a brine of carbonates of calcium and magnesium in the manufacture of salt for food and pharmaceutical uses
 In fortifying (Ca supplement) fruit drinks, such as orange juice, and infant formula
 As a digestive aid (called Choona, used in India in paan, a mixture of areca nuts, calcium hydroxide and a variety of seeds wrapped in betel leaves)
 As a substitute for baking soda in making papadam
 In the removal of carbon dioxide from controlled atmosphere produce storage rooms
 In the preparation of mushroom growing substrates

Native American uses 

 In Nahuatl, the language of the Aztecs, the word for calcium hydroxide is nextli. In a process called nixtamalization, maize is cooked with nextli to become , also known as hominy. Nixtamalization significantly increases the bioavailability of niacin (vitamin B3), and is also considered tastier and easier to digest. Nixtamal is often ground into a flour, known as masa, which is used to make tortillas and tamales.

In chewing coca leaves, calcium hydroxide is usually chewed alongside to keep the alkaloid stimulants chemically available for absorption by the body. Similarly, Native Americans traditionally chewed tobacco leaves with calcium hydroxide derived from burnt mollusc shells to enhance the effects. It has also been used by some indigenous American tribes as an ingredient in yopo, a psychedelic snuff prepared from the beans of some Anadenanthera species.

Asian uses

Calcium hydroxide is typically added to a bundle of areca nut and betel leaf called "paan" to keep the alkaloid stimulants chemically available to enter the bloodstream via sublingual absorption.

It is used in making naswar (also known as nass or niswar), a type of dipping tobacco made from fresh tobacco leaves, calcium hydroxide (chuna or soon), and wood ash.  It is consumed most in the Pathan diaspora, Afghanistan, Pakistan, India and Bangladesh. Villagers also use calcium hydroxide to paint their mud houses in Afghanistan, Pakistan and India.

Health risks
Unprotected exposure to Ca(OH)2 can cause severe skin irritation, chemical burns, blindness, lung damage or rashes.

See also
 Baralyme (carbon dioxide absorbent)
 Cement
 Lime mortar
 Lime plaster
 Plaster
 Magnesium hydroxide (less alkaline due to a lower solubility product)
 Soda lime (carbon dioxide absorbent)
 Whitewash

References

External links
 
 
 CDC – NIOSH Pocket Guide to Chemical Hazards – Calcium Hydroxide
  MSDS Data Sheet

Building materials
Calcium compounds
Dental materials
Hydroxides
Inorganic compounds
Intoxication
E-number additives